Aespa is a South Korean girl group.

Aespa may also refer to:

 Aespa, Rapla County, a small borough in Estonia
 Archivo Español de Arqueología (AEspA), a scientific journal published by the Spanish National Research Council

See also
 Vana-Aespa, formerly part of Aespa, Estonia